Garden City High School is a public high school located in Garden City, Michigan, United States.

History

1950–1964

The first classes began in the fall of 1950 and the first graduating class was in spring 1952. The school mascot was the Panther and the school colors were Royal Blue and Gray, as indicated in the school's 1st year book (The Blue And Gray, 1952). The colors of Royal Blue, Gray and/or White also were in use.

1964–1982

By the early 1960s Garden City had grown to the point it needed a second high school, and West Senior High School was constructed and opened in 1964. It was nicknamed Garden City West.  At this point in time, Garden City High School began going by the name Garden City East.

1982–present

Garden City East (the current location of Garden City High School) and Garden City West  (the current location of Garden City Middle School) consolidated during the 1982-1983 school year, and no longer went by the nickname Garden City East and Garden City West.  Prior to this consolidation, Garden City East was known as the Panthers with the colors Royal Blue and White.  Garden City West was known as the Tigers and were Black and Orange.  When the 2 schools consolidated, the first graduating class chose the new colors and mascot. The seniors coming from West chose the mascot (the Cougar) and the seniors from East chose the colors (Royal Blue and Orange). The senior classes went from approximately 300 students at each school, to a total of a little over 600 students in the graduating class of 1983. In 2008, Garden City High School made the decision to switch to the trimester academic system, which saw advantages as well as disadvantages. In 2015, due to a lack of money, the Garden City School Board made the decision to switch back to the traditional semester system for the 2015-2016 school year and beyond.

References

External links
 
 

Public high schools in Michigan
Schools in Wayne County, Michigan
Educational institutions established in 1982
1982 establishments in Michigan